Viburnum opulus, the guelder-rose or guelder rose is a species of flowering plant in the family Adoxaceae (formerly Caprifoliaceae) native to Europe, northern Africa and central Asia.

Description

The leaf buds are green, with valvate bud scales.

The hermaphrodite flowers are white, produced in corymbs  in diameter at the top of the stems; each corymb comprises a ring of outer sterile flowers 1.5–2 cm in diameter with conspicuous petals, surrounding a center of small (5 mm), fertile flowers; the flowers are produced in early summer, and pollinated by insects. The fruit is a globose bright red drupe 7–10 mm diameter, containing a single seed. The seeds are dispersed by birds.

Names
The common name 'guelder rose' relates to the Dutch province of Gelderland, where a popular cultivar, the snowball tree, supposedly originated. Other common names include water elder, cramp bark, snowball tree, common snowball, and European cranberrybush, though this plant is not closely related to the cranberry. Some botanists also include the North American species Viburnum trilobum as V. opulus var. americanum Ait., or as V. opulus subsp. trilobum (Marshall) Clausen.

Phylogeny
Viburnum opulus is a member of the Viburnum genus which contains 160 to 170 species. It is classified in the subsection Opulus, which usually contains 5 species. Phylogenetic analyses suggest the following relationship between those species:

Cultivation

Viburnum opulus is grown as an ornamental plant for its flowers and berries, growing best on moist, moderately alkaline soils, though tolerating most soil types well. Several cultivars have been selected, including 'Roseum', in which all the flowers are only of the larger sterile type, with globular flower heads.

The shrub is also cultivated as a component of hedgerows, cover plantings, and as part of other naturalistic plantings in its native regions.

It is naturalised in North America.

The cultivars 'Notcutt’s Variety', 'Roseum' and the yellow-fruited 'Xanthocarpum' have gained the Royal Horticultural Society's Award of Garden Merit.

Uses
The fruit is edible in small quantities, with a very acidic taste; it can be used to make jelly. It is however mildly toxic, and may cause vomiting or diarrhea if eaten in large amounts.

The term 'cramp bark' is related to the bark's ability to reduce smooth muscle tightness. Relieving this type of muscle tightness is most often associated with relieving menstrual (period) cramps. However, the bark can also be used during pregnancy for cramps or pain and general muscle cramping.

Cultural meaning

Mentions of the viburnum can be found throughout Ukrainian folklore such as songs, decorative art, Ukrainian embroidery, and poetry. Its symbolic roots can be traced to the Slavic paganism of millennia ago. According to a legend, kalyna was associated with the birth of the Universe, the so-called Fire Trinity: the Sun, the Moon, and the Star. Its berries symbolize one's home and native land, blood, and family roots. Kalyna is often depicted on Ukrainian embroidery: ritual cloths and shirts. In Slavic paganism kalyna also represents the beauty of a young lady, which rhymes well in the Ukrainian language: ka-ly-na – div-chy-na. The song Chervona Kalyna was the anthem of the Ukrainian Sich Riflemen and the Ukrainian Insurgent Army; along with these national liberating movements in 20th century guelder rose was established as a symbol of riflemen honor, and state independence.

Viburnum opulus (kalina) is also one of the national symbols of Russia. In Russia the Viburnum fruit is called kalina (калина) and is considered a national symbol. Kalina derived in Russian language from kalit''' or raskalyat', which means "to make red-hot". The red fiery color of the berries represents beauty in Russian culture and together with sweet raspberries it symbolises the passionate love of a beautiful maiden, since berries were always an erotic symbol in Russia. The bitter side of the red fruit also symbolizes love separation in Russian folk culture. The name of the Russian song Kalinka is a diminutive of Kalina. Viburnum opulus is also an important symbol of the Russian national ornamental wood painting handicraft style called Khokhloma.

In Romanian, which has been influenced by East Slavic culture, Viburnum opulus is called călin. Călin is also used as both a given name and a surname.

References

External links

Blamey, M. & Grey-Wilson, C. (1989). Flora of Britain and Northern Europe. Hodder & Stoughton.
 Huxley, A., ed. (1992). New RHS Dictionary of Gardening''. Macmillan.
 Flora Europaea: Viburnum opulus
 Plants for a Future: Viburnum opulus

opulus
Flora of Africa
Flora of Asia
Flora of Europe
Garden plants
Medicinal plants
National symbols of Ukraine
Plants described in 1753
Taxa named by Carl Linnaeus